Allan Von Schenkel (born July 31, 1975) is an American double bassist, performance artist, songwriter, guitarist and composer. He has developed connections with many important personalities in music, including Lee Hoiby and Yoko Ono.  Schenkel has performed with a variety of musicians such as Wynton Marsalis, Jimmy Cobb, Merle Haggard, and Steve Vai.

Biography
Von Schenkel grew up near Mount Shasta, California. He attended Shasta College in Redding, California from 1993 to 1996 and lived in Lansing, Michigan and attended University of Michigan, Michigan State University, and Wayne State University and the Conservatorio di Trieste, Italy from 1996 until he relocated to Washington, D.C. in 2005.

Von Schenkel has composed over three hundred musical works including three musicals and twenty plays including 'Morrissey Convention and the novel 'Skovgaaard.

Since 2006 he has composed alongside Kristen Williams large scale Performance Art works that include music, dance, film and acting.  '69 Ways to Fall in LOVE'; premiered at the Capital Fringe Festival in Washington DC in 2007. 'He Loved The Soft Porn of The City' at Fringe Festivals in Montreal, New York City and Washington DC in 2012.

Von Schenkel is best known as a performer of contemporary classical music and performance art. His main mentors on the bass have been Gary Karr and Stefano Sciascia. Von Schenkel studied with Sciascia in Italy from 2002 to 2003.

Since 2004, Von Schenkel has expanded his career to include promoting contemporary music for the double bass from around the world. As a member of the Basso Moderno Duo, alongside pianist Kristen Williams since 2006, Von Schenkel has commissioned more than 150 composers from dozens of countries in all regions of the world. In addition, he has premiered works by Karlheinz Stockhausen and Alan Hovhaness. In November 2005, he performed the works of Lee Hoiby, together with the composer himself at the Cosmos in Washington DC.  In 2006, renowned composer and artist Yoko Ono wrote "Secret Piece II" for Allan Von Schenkel, which he premiered at the Hirshhorn Museum. This and many of the other pieces Schenkel performs are, according to him, "just as much art as music." This has made Von Schenkel a notable performance artist. These works involve Schenkel using the double bass in innovative ways by expanding its range, incorporating altered tunings and treating the instrument like a voice. Since the beginning of his career, VonSchenkel has attempted to lead an expansion in the popularity of the double bass while also exploring its musicological nature and expanding its uses. He believes that his entry into the world of performance art may be an important step in this process. American composers Ned Rorem, Pauline Oliveros, Leo Kraft and other celebrated American composers composed works for the Basso Moderno Duo which were premiered at the Smithsonian American Art Museum in July 2007.

In 2010, Von Schenkel formed the Moderno Trio along with Kristen Williams (piano) and James Edwards (Drums).  The Moderno Trio toured with their mixed media composition, in memory of composer Morten Skovgaard Danielsen, "He Loved The Soft Porn of the City" at the 2012 Fringe Festivals in Washington DC, New York City and Montreal, Canada. 

Von Schenkel has been on a musical hiatus since 2012. 

1975 births
Classical double-bassists
American performance artists
American male composers
21st-century American composers
University of Michigan alumni
Michigan State University alumni
Wayne State University alumni
Living people
21st-century double-bassists
21st-century American male musicians